The Syrian Network for Human Rights (SNHR) is a UK-based independent monitoring group, which monitors casualties and briefs various United Nations agencies. It monitors Syrian casualties of all the parties in the Syrian civil war. The SNHR was founded in June 2011 by Fadel Abdul Ghany, who is the chairman of the board of directors. Members have been detained, and many now live outside Syria.

Its reports have been cited by news media, non-governmental organizations, as well as by the United Nations High Commissioner for Human Rights.

Accuracy

Fadel Abdul Ghany stated that figures will be vital if peace comes to Syria in establishing transitional justice. In tracking deaths, Ghany has said he used similar tactics to those of the Syrian Observatory for Human Rights, but the SNHR only count civilians. Ghany said accurate counting was immensely challenging due to a number of factors including the complexity of the conflict, the lack of direct access to conflict areas, and ethnic and political divisions.

During the month of March 2017, according to figures released by the SNHR, more Syrian civilians were killed by United States-led coalitions than by ISIS or Russian-led forces. The SNHR acknowledged the real number of civilians killed in the conflict could be much higher because of the difficulties in keeping track of victims.

In 2018, The Violations Documentation Center in Syria (VDC) counted nearly 9,500 deaths in detention since 2011, compared to over 13,000 counted by the SNHR. The VDC acknowledged its estimates were more conservative than the SNHR as its methodology was to only document deaths once information like the name of the victims and the circumstances surrounding their deaths were confirmed.

As of May 2019, according to the SNHR, nearly 128,000 people have never emerged from Bashar al-Assad's secret network of prisons – and nearly 14,000 were killed by torture. The New York Times reported that the SNHR's tally, described as the most rigorous, was probably an undercount. Anne Barnard of The New York Times was asked how the SNHR compiled their figures. Barnard said the reason they were considered the most rigorous and reliably conservative numbers is their numbers were actual counts of reports they received, and they were not extrapolations or estimates. Barnard said a death had to be reported by a family member or a direct witness and they did not take third party accounts. She added that they took phone calls and had a form on their website, and then they went through and verified what they could in the detailed report. They also went back and called people listed as possible family members of people who were missing for a long time to find out if they were still missing.

It has been used a source in reports by Amnesty International and the US State Department.

Governance

SNHR is registered as a non-profit limited liability company in the United Kingdom, and a non-profit organization in the United States. It is governed by a Board of Directors with five members and its executive director manages seven divisions. As of 2019, it has 27 full-time employees as well as over 70 volunteers.

See also
Syrian Observatory for Human Rights
Violations Documentation Center in Syria

References

External links
SNHR website

Organizations of the Syrian civil war